Pablo Carreño Busta was the defending champion, but lost to Daniil Medvedev in the second round.

Damir Džumhur won the title, defeating Ričardas Berankis in the final, 6–2, 1–6, 6–4.

Seeds
The top four seeds received a bye into the second round.

Draw

Finals

Top half

Bottom half

Qualifying

Seeds

Qualifiers

Lucky loser

Qualifying draw

First qualifier

Second qualifier

Third qualifier

Fourth qualifier

References
 Main draw
 Qualifying draw

2017 ATP World Tour
2017 Men's Singles